Given a transformation between input and output values, described by a mathematical function f, optimization deals with generating and selecting a best solution from some set of available alternatives, by systematically choosing input values from within an allowed set, computing the output of the function, and recording the best output values found during the process. Many real-world problems can be modeled in this way. For example, the inputs can be design parameters of a motor, the output can be the power consumption, or the inputs can be business choices and the output can be the obtained profit.

An optimization problem, in this case a minimization problem, can be represented in the following way
Given: a function f : A  R from some set A to the real numbers
Search for: an element x0 in A such that f(x0) ≤ f(x) for all x in A.

In continuous optimization, A is some subset of the Euclidean space Rn, often specified by a set of constraints, equalities or inequalities that the members of A have to satisfy. In combinatorial optimization, A is some subset of a discrete space, like binary strings, permutations, or sets of integers.

The use of optimization software requires that the function f is defined in a suitable programming language and connected at compile or run time to the optimization software. The optimization software will deliver input values in A, the software module realizing f will deliver the computed value f(x) and, in some cases, additional information about the function like derivatives.

In this manner, a clear separation of concerns is obtained: different optimization software modules can be easily tested on the same function f, or a given optimization software can be used for different functions f.

The following tables provide a list of notable optimization software organized according to license and business model type.

Free and open-source software

Applications 

{| class="wikitable"
|-
! Name
! License
! Description
|-
| ADMB || BSD
| nonlinear optimization framework, using automatic differentiation.
|-
| ASCEND || GPL
| mathematical modelling chemical process modelling system.
|-
| CUTEr || GPL
| testing environment for optimization and linear algebra solvers.
|-
| GNU Octave || GPL
| software package featuring a high-level programming language, primarily intended for numerical computations; well recognized free alternative to MATLAB.
|-
| Octeract Engine Community || Octeract EULA
| parallel deterministic global MINLP solver. Octeract Engine Community is a full version of the solver that is free to use for any purpose.
|-
| Scilab || CeCILL
| cross-platform numerical computational package and a high-level, numerically oriented programming language with free numerical optimization framework.
|}

Software libraries 

{| class="wikitable"
|-
! Name
! License
! Description
|-
| ALGLIB || GPL
| dual licensed (GPL/commercial) optimization library (LP, QP and nonlinear programming problems), optionally using automatic differentiation. Cross-language: C++, C#.
|-
| COIN-OR || EPL 1.0
| integer programming, linear programming, nonlinear programming.
|-
|cuOpt
|TBD - NVIDIA
|GPU-accelerated logistics solver that uses heuristics and metaheuristics to calculate complex vehicle routing problem variants with a wide range of constraints. Written in C++ with Python APIs. Early Access program available for members. Free to join.
|-
| Dlib || BSL‑1.0
| unconstrained/box-constrained nonlinear/QP optimization library written in C++.
|-
| GEKKO || MIT
| machine learning and optimization of mixed-integer and differential algebraic equations in Python.
|-
| GLPK || GPL
| GNU Linear Programming Kit with C API.
|-
| HiGHS || MIT
| linear programming (LP), mixed integer programming (MIP), and convex quadratic programming (QP).
|-
| IPOPT || EPL (was CPL)
| large scale nonlinear optimizer for continuous systems (requires gradient), C++ (formerly Fortran and C). It became a part of COIN-OR.
|-
| MINUIT (now MINUIT2) || LGPL
| unconstrained optimizer internally developed at CERN.
|-
| OpenMDAO || 
| Multidisciplinary Design, Analysis, and Optimization (MDAO) framework, written in Python. The development is led out of the NASA Glenn Research Center, with support from the NASA Langley Research Center.
|-
| OptaPlanner || Apache License
| Java constraint solver with construction heuristics and metaheuristics. Integrates with Spring Boot and Quarkus. Runs on Kotlin and Scala too.
|-
| SCIP || Apache License 
| solver for mixed integer programming (MIP) and mixed integer nonlinear programming (MINLP).
|-
| SciPy || BSD
| general numeric package for Python, with some support for optimization.
|}

Proprietary software
 AIMMS – optimization modeling system, including GUI building facilities.
 ALGLIB – dual licensed (GPL/commercial) constrained quadratic and nonlinear optimization library with C++ and C# interfaces.
 Altair HyperStudy – design of experiments and multi-disciplinary design optimization.
 AMPL – modelling language for large-scale linear, mixed integer and nonlinear optimization.
 ANTIGONE – a deterministic global optimization MINLP solver.
 APMonitor – modeling language and optimization suite for large-scale, nonlinear, mixed integer, differential and algebraic equations with interfaces to MATLAB, Python, and Julia.
 Artelys Knitro – large scale nonlinear optimization for continuous and mixed-integer programming.
 ASTOS – AeroSpace Trajectory Optimization Software for launcher, re-entry and generic aerospace problems.
 BARON – optimization of algebraic nonlinear and mixed-integer nonlinear problems.
 COMSOL Multiphysics – a cross-platform finite element analysis, solver and multiphysics simulation software.
 CPLEX – solver for linear and quadratic programming with continuous or integer variables (MIP).
 FEATool Multiphysics – FEA GUI Toolbox for MATLAB.
 FICO Xpress – solver for linear and quadratic programming with continuous or integer variables (MIP).
 FortMP – linear and quadratic programming.
 FortranCalculus Compiler – higher level language for Continuous Modeling, Simulation and Optimization.  Solves Constrained, Implicit, Non-Linear, Algebraic and/or Ordinary Differential Equations using Solvers stored in a library.  Most solvers use Automatic Differentiation to calculate the Jacobian or Hessian matrix.
 FortSP – stochastic programming.
 GAMS – General Algebraic Modeling System.
 :de:Gurobi – solver for linear and quadratic programming with continuous or integer variables (MIP).
 HEEDS MDO – multidisciplinary design optimization using SHERPA, a hybrid, adaptive optimization algorithm.
 IMSL Numerical Libraries – linear, quadratic, nonlinear, and sparse QP and LP optimization algorithms implemented in standard programming languages C, Java, C# .NET, Fortran, and Python.
 IOSO – (Indirect Optimization on the basis of Self-Organization) a multiobjective, multidimensional nonlinear optimization technology.
 Kimeme – an open platform for multi-objective optimization and multidisciplinary design optimization.
 LINDO  (Linear, Interactive, and Discrete Optimizer) a software package for linear programming, integer programming, nonlinear programming, stochastic programming, and global optimization. The "What's Best!" Excel add-in performs linear, integer, and nonlinear optimization using LINDO.
 LIONsolver – an integrated software for data mining, analytics, modeling Learning and Intelligent OptimizatioN and reactive business intelligence approach.
 modeFRONTIER – an integration platform for multi-objective and multi-disciplinary optimization, which provides a seamless coupling with third party engineering tools, enables the automation of the design simulation process, and facilitates analytic decision making.
 Maple – linear, quadratic, and nonlinear, continuous and integer optimization. Constrained and unconstrained. Global optimization with add-on toolbox.
 MATLAB – linear, integer, quadratic, and nonlinear problems with Optimization Toolbox; multiple maxima, multiple minima, and non-smooth optimization problems; estimation and optimization of model parameters.
 MIDACO a lightweight software tool for single- and multi-objective optimization based on evolutionary computing. Written in C/C++ and Fortran with gateways to Excel, VBA, Java, Python, Matlab, Octave, R, C# and Julia.
 Mathematica – large-scale multivariate constrained and unconstrained, linear, quadratic and nonlinear, continuous and integer optimization.
 ModelCenter – a graphical environment for integration, automation, and design optimization.
 MOSEK – linear, quadratic, conic and convex nonlinear, continuous and integer optimization.
 NAG – linear, quadratic, nonlinear, sums of squares of linear or nonlinear functions; linear, sparse linear, nonlinear, bounded or no constraints; local and global optimization; continuous or integer problems.
 NMath – linear, quadratic and nonlinear programming.
 Octeract Engine – a deterministic global optimization MINLP solver. Octeract Engine Community is free to use, and paid plans exist for additional features.
 OptimJ – Java-based modeling language. Premium Edition includes support for Mosek and CPLEX solvers.
 Optimus platform – a process integration and design optimization platform developed by Noesis Solutions.
 optiSLang – software solutions for CAE-based sensitivity analysis, optimization and robustness evaluation.
 OptiY  a design environment providing modern optimization strategies and state of the art probabilistic algorithms for uncertainty, reliability, robustness, sensitivity analysis, data-mining and meta-modeling.
 OptiStruct – award-winning CAE technology for conceptual design synthesis and structural optimization.
 PottersWheel – parameter estimation in ordinary differential equations (MATLAB toolbox, free for academic use).
 pSeven  software platform for automation of engineering simulation and analysis, multidisciplinary optimization and data mining, developed by DATADVANCE.
 SAS – a software suite developed by SAS Institute for advanced analytics (statistics, forecasting, machine learning, optimization, etc.), business intelligence, customer intelligence, data management, risk management, and many more.
 SmartDO – multidisciplinary global design optimization, specialized in computer-aided engineering (CAE). using the direct global search approaches. 
 SNOPT – large-scale optimization problems.
 The Unscrambler X – product formulation and process optimization software.
 TOMLAB – supports global optimization, integer programming, all types of least squares, linear, quadratic and unconstrained programming for MATLAB. TOMLAB supports solvers like CPLEX, SNOPT, KNITRO and MIDACO.
 VisSim – a visual block diagram language for simulation and optimization of dynamical systems.
 WORHP – a large-scale sparse solver for continuous nonlinear optimization.

Freeware/free for academic use
 AIMMS
 AMPL
 APMonitor – free for academic and commercial use alike, with Julia, Python and MATLAB integrations.
 ASTOS
 CPLEX
 Couenne – An open source solver for the deterministic global optimization of MINLPs licensed under the Eclipse Public License.
 FICO Xpress
 Galahad library
 GEKKO Python
 LIONsolver
 MIDACO – a software package for numerical optimization based on evolutionary computing.
 MINTO – integer programming solver using branch and bound algorithm; freeware for personal use.
 MOSEK – a large scale optimization software. Solves linear, quadratic, conic and convex nonlinear, continuous and integer optimization.
 OptimJ – Java-based modeling language; the free edition includes support for lp_solve, GLPK and LP or MPS file formats.
 PottersWheel – parameter estimation in ordinary differential equations (free MATLAB toolbox for academic use).
 Pyomo  collection of Python software packages for formulating optimization models.
 WORHP

See also
 Comparison of optimization software
 List of computer algebra systems
 List of constraint programming languages
 List of numerical libraries
 List of optimization algorithms
 List of SMT solvers

References

Optimization software